Dorchester Shores Reservation is a Massachusetts state park consisting of three non-contiguous areas totaling  along the eastern edge of the Dorchester section of Boston. The area is composed of beaches and a park along the extended mouth of the Neponset River: Savin Hill/Malibu Beach, Tenean Beach, and Victory Road Park. Savin Hill is adjacent to Malibu Beach and has been restored to its original Olmsted Brothers design. The reservation is managed by the Department of Conservation and Recreation.

In October 2018, Boston Mayor Marty Walsh announced a comprehensive climate change adaptation proposal to protect the Boston Harbor coastline from flooding, and in October 2020, the Walsh administration released a 174-page climate change adaptation report for the Boston Harbor coastline in Dorchester. In February 2022, Massachusetts Governor Charlie Baker announced an $8.2 million project to construct a 0.7-mile shared-use path from Tenean Beach to Morrissey Boulevard and that will connect the Boston Harborwalk with the Neponset River Reservation via Morrissey (including a 670-foot boardwalk in the salt marshes near the National Grid gas tank) that will be included in the $9.5 billion in federal funds the state government received under the Infrastructure Investment and Jobs Act. In August 2022, Governor Baker signed into law a bill co-sponsored by Massachusetts State Senator Nick Collins and Massachusetts State Representative Daniel J. Hunt establishing a Dorchester Shores Reservation and Parks Trust Fund administered by the Massachusetts Secretary of Energy and Environmental Affairs to ensure the long-term conservation, maintenance and improvement of Reservation properties.

Activities and amenities
Malibu Beach: Swimming and bathhouse. 
Savin Hill Beach: Swimming, sports fields, tot-lot playground.  
Tenean Beach: Swimming, playground, tennis and basketball courts.
Victory Road Park: The park occupies a reclaimed landfill and is designed for passive use.
The reservation also offers picnicking, restrooms, concessions, fishing, first aid, and information.

See also 

 List of parks in Boston

References

External links
Dorchester Shores Reservation Department of Conservation and Recreation
Dorchester Shores Reservation Map Department of Conservation and Recreation

State parks of Massachusetts
Parks in Boston
Dorchester, Boston
Protected areas established in 1962
1962 establishments in Massachusetts